The 56th ceremony of the Golden Globe Awards, honoring the best in film and television for 1998, were held on January 24, 1999, at the Beverly Hilton Hotel in Beverly Hills, California. The nominations were announced on December 17, 1998.

Winners and nominees

Film 

The following films received multiple nominations:

The following films received multiple wins:

Television 
The following programs received multiple nominations:

The following programs received multiple awards:

Ceremony

Presenters 

 Ben Affleck
 Lauren Bacall
 Kim Basinger
 Warren Beatty
 Roberto Benigni
 Annette Bening
 Sean Connery
 Jamie Lee Curtis
 Matt Damon
 Anthony Edwards
 Calista Flockhart
 Peter Fonda
 Jodie Foster
 Michael J. Fox
 Brendan Fraser
 Melanie Griffith
 Holly Hunter
 Jeremy Irons
 Christine Lahti
 Jane Leeves
 George Lucas
 Bill Paxton
 Kelly Preston
 Freddie Prinze, Jr.
 Ving Rhames
 Tim Robbins
 Rick Schroder
 Tom Selleck
 Jane Seymour
 Ben Stiller
 Sharon Stone
 Gloria Stuart
 Charlize Theron
 John Travolta
 Alfre Woodard

Cecil B. DeMille Award 
Jack Nicholson

Awards breakdown 
The following networks received multiple nominations:

The following networks received multiple wins:

See also
71st Academy Awards
19th Golden Raspberry Awards
5th Screen Actors Guild Awards
50th Primetime Emmy Awards
51st Primetime Emmy Awards
 52nd British Academy Film Awards
 53rd Tony Awards
 1998 in film
 1998 in American television

References

056
1998 film awards
1998 television awards
January 1999 events in the United States
Golden